The Presentment Clause (Article I, Section 7, Clauses 2 and 3) of the United States Constitution outlines federal legislative procedure by which bills originating in Congress become federal law in the United States.

Text
The Presentment Clause, which is contained in Article I, Section 7, Clauses 2 and 3, provides:

Summary
 A bill must be passed in identical form by both the House of Representatives and the Senate. It is common practice for each House to pass its own version of a bill, and then to refer the two versions to a conference committee, which resolves disagreements between the two versions, and drafts a compromise bill; the compromise bill can then be voted upon and passed by both Houses in identical form.
 After a bill passes both Houses, it must be presented to the President for his approval.
 If the President approves the bill and signs it, then the bill becomes law.  
 If the President disapproves the bill and vetoes it, then he must return the bill, along with a veto message (his objections), back to the House in which the bill was created.
 A two-thirds majority of both Houses may override the veto, and the bill will become law without the President's signature. In overriding a veto, the votes of both houses must be done by yeas and nays, and the names of the persons voting for and against the bill must be recorded.
 If, while the Congress is in session, the President does not sign a bill or veto it within 10 days (not counting Sundays) after its presentment, then it automatically becomes law. If a bill is presented on a Monday or Tuesday, the President has 11 real days; otherwise he has 12.
 If, while Congress is not in session (adjourned), the President does not sign a bill or veto it within 10 days (not counting Sundays) after its presentment, then it fails to become law. This "pocket veto"—so called because the President is then said to have put the bill in his pocket and forgotten about it—cannot be overridden by Congress, but once Congress reconvenes it can pass the same bill again. In addition, Congressional "pro forma" sessions may be used to prevent pocket vetoes.

Veto issues

Line-item veto
The Supreme Court decision in Clinton v. City of New York, 524 U.S. 417 (1998), struck down as unconstitutional the Line Item Veto Act of 1996, holding that the line-item veto violated the Presentment Clause.

Legislative veto
The Supreme Court also found the legislative veto unconstitutional in Immigration and Naturalization Service v. Chadha, 462 U.S. 919 (1983), as violating the Presentment Clause and bicameralism.

Exclusion of Sundays
The ten-day period for the presidential review of legislation excludes Sundays. Some scholars believe this exclusion was not for religious reasons, but intended to support a deliberative process in which the President would consult and seek advice regarding the merits of the proposed law. For instance, Jaynie Randall has stated that because the blue laws of various states restricted travel on Sundays, to allow a full ten days of consideration between the President and his advisors, the drafters of the Constitution excluded Sundays from the review period.
However, Justice Brewer, speaking for a unanimous Supreme Court in Church of the Holy Trinity v. United States, 143 U.S. 457 (1892), cited the Presentment Clause as a clear example of why "no purpose of action against religion can be imputed to any legislation, state or national, because this is a religious people." Specifically, the Court stated:

Constitutional amendments
Article Five of the Constitution, which prescribes the process whereby the Constitution may be altered, contains no requirement that a joint resolution proposing a constitutional amendment be presented to the president for approval or veto before it goes out to the states. In Hollingsworth v. Virginia, 3 U.S. (3 Dall.) 378 (1798), the Supreme Court affirmed that doing so is not necessary. Consequently, the president has no official function in the process.

National Archives 
 provides that whenever a bill becomes law or takes effect, it will be received by the Archivist of the United States from the President. This allows the National Archives and Records Administration to maintain records of and publish the enacted laws.

See also
Signing statement

References 

U.S. Senate: Constitution of the United States

Clauses of the United States Constitution
Article One of the United States Constitution